The 1999–2000 Montreal Canadiens season was the club's 91st season of play. The club failed to qualify for the 2000 Stanley Cup playoffs. Pierre Boivin replaced Ronald Corey as team president of the Canadiens. On September 2, 1999, Molson executive James Arnett announced that Molson would put the franchise up for sale.

Off season
Saku Koivu makes Canadiens history, as the first European to be named the team's captain. He succeeds Vincent Damphousse, who was traded the previous season.

Regular season

Final standings

Schedule and results

Player statistics

Regular season
Scoring

Goaltending

Awards and records
 Alain Vigneault, Runner-Up, Jack Adams Trophy

Transactions

Draft picks
Montreal's draft picks at the 1999 NHL Entry Draft held at the FleetCenter in Boston, Massachusetts.

See also
 1999–2000 NHL season

References
 Canadiens on Hockey Database
 Canadiens on NHL Reference

Montreal Canadiens seasons
Montreal Canadiens season, 1999-2000
Montreal